Patrick Howlett is a Canadian visual artist born in Toronto, Ontario on September 17, 1971. He is currently based in Montreal, Quebec. Howlett obtained a Bachelor of Fine Arts at Concordia University, Montreal in 1997 and completed a Master of Fine Arts at the University of Victoria in 2006. In 2008, Howlett was a finalist in the RBC Canadian Painting Competition. His internationally exhibited work typically involves a commentary on technology and the digital age that results in multimedia paintings and drawings, and is often centred on the relationship between an image and a title. His work has been presented at the National Gallery of Canada, Ottawa; Musée d’art contemporain, Montréal;  The Power Plant, Toronto; Art Gallery of Edmonton, Edmonton;  Contemporary Art Gallery, Vancouver; Atelierhof Kreuzberg, Berlin; Maison de la culture Côtes-des-Neiges, Montréal; Khyber Institute for Contemporary Arts, Halifax.

Art Practice 

Howlett’s artistic practice is careful, methodical and deliberate. He works in a variety of media, including tempera paint, watercolour paint, silverpoint, coloured pencil and charcoal. He is well known for his geometric abstract paintings and drawings, which are often compact, dense and intensely layered. Howlett works with traditional surface treatments, media and brushwork that go back to the Renaissance. Howlett also incorporates a digital element into his work: he generates Google image searches for inspiration and source material which he then synthesizes into the colour, shape and composition of his paintings.

References

Further reading 

Balzer, David.  Eye Candy.  Eye Weekly, 30 December 2008;
Dault, Gary Michael. Gallery Going. The Globe and Mail, 27 December 2008;
Dubinsky, Lon.  Pas Tout à Fait... / Not Quite.... Pointe-Claire, Québec: Stewart Hall Art Gallery, 2011;
Jordan, Betty Ann. Trip-in. Toronto Life, February 2006;
Lauder, Adam. Patrick Howlett: the possible and the real. Hunter and Cook 8, Winter 2011;
Linsley, Robert. How Hummingbird? Abstract art in the era of global conceptualism, 3 February 2013;
Luo, Amy. Patrick Howlett: How Hummingbirds Choose Flowers. Artoronto.ca, 29 January 2013;
Stewart, Laverne.  Creative, Independent, thinker.  The Daily Gleaner, 13 September 2008;
MacMillan, Lauren, ed. RBC Canadian Painting Competition: Ten Years. Toronto: Royal Bank of Canada, 2008;
Woodley, E. C. Patrick Howlett. Border Crossings, issue 126, May 2013;
Wu, Yan. Site Exercises at Susan Hobbs Gallery. Artforum.com, 20 August 2010.

External links 

Review in Canadian Art online magazine by Wojciech Olejnik
"See It" review in Canadian Art magazine
Information on exhibition with Gary Spearin at the Khyber Centre For The Arts
Interview with Standard Interview
Review in Globe and Mail newspaper by Gary Michael Dault
Information on 2012 exhibition at Susan Hobbs Gallery
FrameWork essay by Kim Neudorf

1971 births
Living people
Artists from Toronto
Canadian male painters
20th-century Canadian painters
21st-century Canadian painters
20th-century Canadian male artists
21st-century Canadian male artists